Global marketing is defined as “marketing on a worldwide scale reconciling or taking global operational differences, similarities and opportunities in order to reach global objectives".

Global marketing is also a field of study in general business management that markets products, solutions and services to customers locally, nationally, and internationally.

International marketing is the application of marketing principles in more than one country, by companies overseas or across national borders. It is done through the export of a company's product into another location or entry through a joint venture with another firm within the country, or foreign direct investment into the country.  International marketing is required for the development of the marketing mix for the country. International marketing includes the use of existing marketing strategies, mix and tools for export, relationship strategies such as localization, local product offerings, pricing, production and distribution with customized promotions, offers, website, social media and leadership.

Internationalization and international marketing is when the value of the company is "exported and there is inter-firm and firm learning, optimization, and efficiency in economies of scale and scope".

Evolution
The international marketplace was transformed by shifts in trading techniques, standards and practices. These changes were reinforced and retained by advanced technologies and evolving economic relationships amongst the companies and organizations involved in international trade. The traditional ethnocentric conceptual view of international marketing trade was counterbalanced by a global view of markets.

Domestic marketing 
Domestic marketing consists of the marketing strategies used by a company to allow customers to purchase a product or service within a local market

Domestic marketing leads to familiarity with the extent of political risk, the quality of skilled human resources and of natural resources, and the ramifications of existing and likely legislation in relevant areas such as safety, hygiene, employment, and ownership of capital.

These markets are restrained by the laws and regulations of the country.  Domestic marketing is typically organized in the headquarters.

Global marketing 

Global marketing relies on firms that understands the requirements associated with servicing customers locally with global standard solutions or products and localizes that product as to maintain an optimal balance of cost, efficiency, customization and localization in a control-customization continuum to meet local, national and global requirements.

Global marketing and global branding are integrated.  Branding is a structured process of analyzing "soft" assets and "hard" assets of a firm's resources.  The strategic analysis and development of a brand includes customer analysis (trends, motivation, unmet needs, segmentation), competitive analysis (brand image/brand identity, strengths, strategies, vulnerabilities), and self-analysis (existing brand image, brand heritage, strengths/capabilities, organizational values).

"Global brand identity development is the process of establishing brands of products, the firm, and services locally and worldwide with consideration for scope, product attributes, quality, uses, users and country of origin; organizational attributes; personality attributes, and brand-customer relationship; and important symbols, trademarks metaphors, imagery, mood, photography and the company's brand heritage".

A global marketing and branding implementation system distributes marketing assets, affiliate programs and materials, internal communications, newsletters, investor materials, event promotions and trade shows to deliver integrated, comprehensive and focused communication, access and value to the customers.

Elements

Product
A minimum level of performance is placed onto each product.

Price
The price of a product varies based on production cost, target segment, and supply-demand dynamics alongside several types of pricing strategies, each tied in with an overall business plan. Pricing is also used as a demarcation to differentiate the image of a product.

The price varies from market to market.

Place
The place refers to the point of sale.

The distribution of product is reliant on the competition offered to the market. Coca-Cola does not implement vending machines in all cultures. Beverages are sold by the pallet via warehouse stores in the United States while it is not seen in India. Placement decisions are reliant on the position of the product in the market place. For example, a high-end product would not be distributed via a dollar store in the United States. Conversely, a product promoted as the low-cost option in France would give rise to limited success in a high end area.

Promotion
Advertising, word of mouth, press reports, incentives, commissions and awards to the trade will account for product acknowledgement. It may also include consumer schemes, direct marketing, contests and prizes.

People 
People may be considered to be a firm's most valuable asset. Core values of firms such as integrity, honesty, leadership, social responsibility, drive for profit, drive for quality products and services are reasons behind customer loyalty.

Processes 
Processes for creative and delivering products and services are intangible assets that improves the quality of the product and services.

Physical Evidence 
Digital economy today enables firms to provide non-physical services over the internet and companies' products such as Software-as-a-Service (Saas).  Historically, banks with retail locations signal the financial strength of their institutions.  Retail locations for consumer brands add onto the evidence of the popularity and reach of their brands.

There are trust requirements before a customer makes a purchase from a company, as such, companies without brick and mortar must provide existential proof of their legitimate software company.

Advantages

Global marketing may lead to:
 Economies of scale in production and distribution
 Lower marketing costs
 Power and scope
 Consistency in brand image
 Ability to leverage ideas quickly and efficiently
 Uniformity of marketing practices
 Helps to establish relationships outside of the 'political arena'
 Helps to encourage ancillary industries to be set up to cater to the needs of the global player
 Benefits of eMarketing over traditional marketing

Disadvantages
Global marketing may also lead to:
 Differences in consumer needs, wants, and usage patterns for products
 Differences in consumer response to marketing mix elements
 Differences in brand and product development and the competitive environment
 Differences in the legal environment, some of which may conflict with those of the home market
 Differences in the institutions available, some of which may call for the creation of entirely new ones (e.g. infrastructure)
 Differences in administrative procedures
 Differences in product placement
 Differences in the administrative procedures and product placement can occur

See also
 Advertising
 Advertising research
 Globalization
 International marketing
 Marketing
 Marketing research
 Nation branding
 wikt:Picture Sorts
 Visual marketing

References

Further reading
 Hollensen, Svend (2020) Global Marketing, 8th edition, Pearson,  .
 Svante Andersson & Göran Svensson (editors) (2009) Global Marketing: think globally and act locally, Lund: Studentlitteratur,  .
 Kotabe, Masaki and Helsen, Kristiaan (2004) Global Marketing Management, 3rd edition, John Wiley & Sons,  .
 Philip Kotler & Keller (2005) Marketing Management, 12th edition,  .
 Theodore Levitt (May–June 1983) "The Globalization of Markets", Harvard Business Review 61: 92–10.
 Young, Charles E. (April 2005) Advertising Research Handbook, Ideas in Flight, Seattle, .

External links

Digital Marketing

Types of marketing